Pavoclinus pavo, the Peacock klipfish, is a species of clinid found from Lüderitzbucht, Namibia to the Kei River, South Africa where it can be found in weedy areas at the low tide line.  It can reach a maximum length of  TL.  This species feeds primarily on amphipods, isopods, gastropods and polychaete worms.

References

pavo
Fish described in 1908